Dashtadem may refer to:
 Dashtadem, Aragatsotn, Armenia
 Dashtadem, Lori, Armenia